David Hammerstein Mintz (born 23 September 1955) is a Spanish politician and former Member of the European Parliament for Los Verdes, part of the European Greens. He used to sit on the European Parliament's Committee on Industry, Research and Energy and its Committee on Petitions. He also worked for an international consumer advocacy group, the Trans-Atlantic Consumer Dialogue (TACD), but is now working for the commons network.

Hammerstein was born in Los Angeles, and graduated in sociology from the University of California in 1978.  From 1991 to 1999, he worked as a Natural economy and geography teacher at secondary level (in Godella).

Career
 1999-2003: Environmental adviser
 1998-2003: Spokesman for Els Verds del País Valencià (Valencian Greens)
 2000-2004: International spokesman for Los Verdes (Spanish Greens)
 2000-2004: Spanish delegate to the European Federation of Green Parties/European Greens

See also
 2004 European Parliament election in Spain

External links

 http://www.davidhammerstein.org 
 http://davidhammerstein.com
 European Parliament biography
 Spanish biography
 

1955 births
Living people
Confederation of the Greens politicians
Confederation of the Greens MEPs
MEPs for Spain 2004–2009
University of California alumni
American emigrants to Spain